This list of compositions by Joseph Martin Kraus is organized by number in Bertil H. van Boer's Die Werke von Joseph Martin Kraus: Systematisch-thematisches Werkverzeichnis, which gives each composition a VB number.

The compositions are also arranged in categories: sacred choral works (VB 1 - 17), secular dramatic works (VB 18 - 34), ballet music (VB 35 - 39), secular cantate (VB 40 - 46), arias and duets (VB 47 - 66), canons (VB 67 - 69), lieder (VB 70 - 120), cantatas and pastorals (VB 121 - 126), symphonies (VB 127 - 148), concertos ( VB 149 - 156), chamber music for more than one instrument (VB 157 - 184), piano music (VB 185 - 193), miscellany (VB 194 - 204).

Bertil van der Boer lists five works mistakenly attributed to Joseph Martin Kraus: a Fugue in D minor by Johann Georg Albrechtsberger, and four pieces by other men named Kraus.

 Requiem in D minor
 Jubileum Mass for Pater Alexander Keck (lost)
 Requiem for Joseph II (lost)
 Miserere in C minor
 Parvum quando in D major
 Te Deum in D major
 Fracto demum Sacramento in D major
 Proh parvule in C major
 Mot en Alsvåldig Magt in E-flat Major
 Stella Coeli in C major
 In te speravi domine in E-flat Major
 Miserere (with Roman Hoffstetter) (lost)
 Miserere Nostri Domine in C minor
 Fragments of a Motet in D major
 Cantata for the Installation of Magnus Lehnberg in D major
 Der Geburt Jesu (lost)
 Der Tod Jesu
 Azire, Opera, 1779 (lost - some orchestral portions remain)
 Proserpin
 Zoelia, ou L'origine de La Felicité (lost)
 Oedipe (destroyed)
 Soliman II, eller De Tre Sultaninnorna
 Aeneas i Carthago, eller Dido och Aeneas
 Musik spiel (unarchieved, lost)
 Le Bon Seigneur, Schauspiel in 3 Acts (lost)
 Hör mina ömma suckar in A major
 4 Intermezzos To Molière's Amphitryon
 Couplets to Fintbergs Bröllop
 Couplets to Fri-Corpsen, eller Dalkarkarne (lost)
 Du, i Hvars Oskuldsfulla in G major
 Couplets Till Födelsedagen (lost)
 Äfventyraren, eller Resan till Månans Ö
 Olympie
 Möt Sveafolk din Tacksamhet in C major
 Choruses to Oedipe
 Marknaden (lost)
 Pantomime in D major
 Pantomime in G major
 Ballet Movements for Gluck's Armide
 Fiskarena
 Zum Geburtstage des Königs
 Funeral Cantata for Gustav III
 La Scusa
 La Pesca
 Den Frid ett Menlöst Hjerta Njuter
 La Gelosia
 La Primavera
 Non piu fra sassi algosi in E major
 In te spero, o sposa amata in B-flat Major
 T'intendo, si mio cor in E-flat Major
 Conservati Fedele in G major
 Duet in G major (lost)
 Aria in A-flat major (lost)
 Misero pargoletto in F minor
 Sentimi, non partir...Al mio bene in E-flat Major
 Innocente donzelletta in B-flat Major
 Aure belle, che spirate in C major
 Du temps qui detruit tout in G major
 Ch'io mai vi possa in C major
 Del destin non vi lagnate in A major
 Ch'io parta? M'accheto in F major
 Se non ti moro al lato in E-flat Major
 Ma, tu tremi in E-flat Major
 Non temer, non son piu amante in B-flat Major
 Fermati!...Se tutti i mali miei in E-flat Major
 Son pietosa e sono amante in F major
 Fra l'ombre un lampo solo in F major
 Carmen Biblicum
 Meine Mutter hat gense in F major
 Chorus and Canon
 Aandes saagte, Vestenvinde in F major
 Schweizerrundgesang in F major
 Rheinweinlied in G major
 An - Als ihm die - Starb in E-flat Major
 An die quelle in E-flat Major
 Die Welt nach Rousseau in G minor
 Die Henne in G minor
 Hans und Hanne in C major
 An den Wind in B-flat Major
 An den Wind in F major
 Ich bin ein deutscher Jüngling in C major
 Ich bin vergnügt in C major
 Daphné am Bach in G major
 Phidile in C major
 Das Rosenband in A major
 Anselmuccio in A major
 An mein mädchen in B-flat Major
 Das schwarze Lischen aus Kastillien in G major
 Der nordische witwer in A major
 Ein Lied um Regen in D major
 Der Mann im Lehnstuhl in G major
 Die mutter bei der Wiege in B-flat Major
 Ein Wiegenlied in E minor
 An das Klavier in E major
 Der Abschied in F minor
 Ein Wiegenlied in G major
 Gesundheit in F major
 Depuis longtemps in G major
 Dors mon enfant in E-flat Major
 Est on Sage in A major
 Point de Tristesse in A major
 Sans Venus in F major
 Aande lente in G major
 Conservati fedele in F major
 Notturno in G major
 Si mio ben in E-flat Major
 L'istessa Canzonetta alla Calabrese in C major
 Ti sento sospiri in G major
 Bröder! se Bålen in G major
 Charon på en Doktor såg (lost)
 Elegie in F major
 Hvart hastar Du? in C major
 Stancer till Elias Martin in G major
 Mine Herrar in A major
 Öfver Mozarts Död in E-flat major
 Posten riktigt öppnad blef in F major
 Se Källan, Se Lunden in D major
 Ynglingarne in D minor
 Atis Och Camilla in G major
 Den 9 Januarii 1793 (lost)
 Gracernas Besök vid Professoren Herr Tobias Sergel (lost)
 Cantate Till en värdig Vän (lost)
 Fiskarstugan
 Måltiden i Fiskarstugan
 Överfarten ifrån Fiskarstugan
 Den 24 Januarii 1792
 Mjölkkammaren på Haga
 Symphony in A major
 Sinfonia Buffa in F major
 Symphony in F
 Symphony (lost)
 Symphony "Göttingen" 1 (lost)
 Symphony "Göttingen" 2 (lost)
 Symphony "Göttingen" 3 (lost)
 Symphony "Göttingen" 4 (lost)
 Symphony "Göttingen" 5 (lost)
 Symphony "Göttingen" 6 (lost)
 Symphony in C major Violino Obligato
 Symphony in C major
 Symphony in C-sharp minor
 Symphony in E minor
 Symphony in C minor
 Symphony in D major
 Symphony in E-flat Major
 Symphony in F major
 Sinfonia Da Chiesa in D major
 Sinfonia Da Chiesa in D minor
 Symphonie Funébre in C minor
 Concerto for 2 Violins (lost)
 Flute Concerto (lost)
 Violin Concerto in C major
 Concerto for Violin & Viola (lost)

 153a. Concerto for Viola & Cello in G major
 153b. Viola Concerto in C major
 153c. Violin Concert in E-flat major
 Sinfonia per la Chiesa; Riksdagsmarsch in D major
 Contradances (lost)
 Duo for Violin & Viola (lost)
 Sonata for Harpsichord & Violin in D minor
 Duo for Flute & Viola in D major
 Sonata for Piano & Violin in D major
 Sonata for Piano & Violin in C major
 Sonata for Piano & Violin in E-flat Major
 Sonata for Piano & Violin in C major
 Allegro for Piano & Violin in D major
 String Trio (lost)
 Piano Trio "Hoffstetter" No. 1 (lost)
 Piano Trio "Hoffstetter" No. 2 (lost)
 Piano Trio "Hoffstetter" No. 3 (lost)
 Piano Trio "Hoffstetter" No. 4 (lost)
 Piano Trio "Hoffstetter" No. 5 (lost)
 Piano Trio "Hoffstetter" No. 6 (lost)
 Piano Trio in D major
 Kleine Quadros
 -
 -
 -
 -
 -
 String Quartet in F minor
 String Quartet in C minor
 String Quartet in E major
 String Quartet in B-flat major
 String Quartet in C major
 String Quartet in G minor
 String Quartet in D major
 String Quartet in A major
 String Quartet in C major
 String Quartet in G major
 Flute Quintet Opus 7 in D major
 Keyboard Sonata for Countess Ingelheim (lost)
 Zwei neue curiose Minuetten fürs Klavier
 Rondo for Keyboard in F major
 Swedish Dance for Keyboard in C major
 Variations for Keyboard in C major
 Larghetto for Keyboard in G major
 Keyboard Sonata in E-flat Major
 Keyboard Sonata in E major
 11 Chorale Preludes for Organ
 Mass in E minor
 Förkunnom högt Hans Lof och Magt in C major
 Du, Vår Välgörare och Far in B-flat Major
 Dröj, Sol, uti din uppgångstimma in D major
 Stücke 1
 Stücke 2
 Stücke 3
 Stücke 4
 Stücke 5
 Stücke 6
 Exercises for Soprano

Addenda (Anhang)
 Mass in E minor
 Entr'acte to Äfventyraren in A major
 Poeter Prisa Många Gånger in A major
 Lydia och Arist in E-flat Major
 Polonaise for Orchestra in D major
 Symphony in D major
 Symphony 'Sigmaringen' 1 in A major (lost)
 Symphony 'Sigmaringen' 2 in G major (lost)
 Symphony 'Sigmaringen' 3 in E-flat Major (lost)
 Symphony 'Sigmaringen' 4 in C major (lost)
 Symphony 'Sigmaringen' 5 in D major (lost)
 Trumpet Concerto (lost)
 Variations for Trumpet and Orchestra (lost)
 Trio for Keyboard, Flute & Cello in C major
 Rondo Capriccio for Keyboard in G major

References

 Bertil van Boer, Jr., Die Werke von Joseph Martin Kraus: Systematisch-Thematisches Werkverzeichnis. Stockholm: Kgl. Schwedischen Musikakademie (1988): xxxiii - xxxix

 
Kraus